José Jair Ruíz Vargas (born 21 March 1995 in Silao, Guanajuato) is a Mexican professional footballer who plays in the forward position for Club León Premier.

References

External links
 
 

Living people
1995 births
Mexican footballers
Association football forwards
Atlético ECCA footballers
Club León footballers
Liga MX players
Liga Premier de México players
Tercera División de México players
Footballers from Guanajuato
People from Silao, Guanajuato